United Nations Security Council Resolution 2182 was adopted on 24 October, 2014. The resolution had 13 votes support and none against, with Jordan and Russia abstaining.

See also 
 List of United Nations Security Council Resolutions 2101 to 2200

References

External links 
Text of the Resolution at undocs.org

2014 United Nations Security Council resolutions
2014 in Somalia
 2182
October 2014 events